Ellis is an unincorporated community in Stockton Township, Greene County, Indiana.

History
Ellis was named in honor of William Ellis, a landowner.

Geography

References

Unincorporated communities in Greene County, Indiana
Unincorporated communities in Indiana
Bloomington metropolitan area, Indiana